William Sealy Gosset (13 June 1876 – 16 October 1937) was an English statistician, chemist and brewer who served as Head Brewer of Guinness and Head Experimental Brewer of Guinness and was a pioneer of modern statistics. He pioneered small sample experimental design and analysis with an economic approach to the logic of uncertainty. Gosset published under the pen name Student and developed most famously Student's t-distribution – originally called Student's "z" – and "Student's test of statistical significance".

Life and career 
Born in Canterbury, England the eldest son of Agnes Sealy Vidal and Colonel Frederic Gosset, R.E. Royal Engineers, Gosset attended Winchester College before matriculating as Winchester Scholar in natural sciences and mathematics at New College, Oxford. Upon graduating in 1899, he joined the brewery of Arthur Guinness & Son in Dublin, Ireland; he spent the rest of his 38-year career at Guinness.

Gosset had three children with Marjory Gosset (née Phillpotts). Harry Gosset (1907–1965) was a consultant paediatrician; Bertha Marian Gosset (1909–2004) was a geographer and nurse; the youngest, Ruth Gosset (1911–1953) married the Oxford mathematician Douglas Roaf and had five children.

In his job as Head Experimental Brewer at Guinness, the self-trained Gosset developed new statistical methods – both in the brewery and on the farm – now central to the design of experiments, to proper use of significance testing on repeated trials, and to analysis of economic significance (an early instance of decision theory interpretation of statistics) and more, such as his small-sample, stratified, and repeated balanced experiments on barley for proving the best yielding varieties. Gosset acquired that knowledge by study, by trial and error, by cooperating with others, and by spending two terms in 1906–1907 in the Biometrics laboratory of Karl Pearson. Gosset and Pearson had a good relationship. Pearson helped Gosset with the mathematics of his papers, including the 1908 papers, but had little appreciation of their importance. The papers addressed the brewer's concern with small samples; biometricians like Pearson, on the other hand, typically had hundreds of observations and saw no urgency in developing small-sample methods.

Gosset's first publication came in 1907, "On the Error of Counting with a Haemacytometer," in which – unbeknownst to Gosset aka "Student" – he rediscovered the Poisson distribution. Another researcher at Guinness had previously published a paper containing trade secrets of the Guinness brewery. The economic historian Stephen Ziliak discovered in the Guinness Archives that to prevent further disclosure of confidential information, the Guinness Board of Directors allowed its scientists to publish research on condition that they do not mention "1) beer, 2) Guinness, or 3) their own surname". To Ziliak, Gosset seems to have gotten his pen name "Student" from his 1906–1907 notebook on counting yeast cells with a haemacytometer, "The Student's Science Notebook" Thus his most noteworthy achievement is now called Student's, rather than Gosset's, t-distribution and test of statistical significance.

Gosset published most of his 21 academic papers, including The probable error of a mean, in Pearson's journal Biometrika under the pseudonym Student. It was, however, not Pearson but Ronald A. Fisher who appreciated the understudied importance of Gosset's small-sample work. Fisher wrote to Gosset in 1912 explaining that Student's z-distribution should be divided by degrees of freedom not total sample size. From 1912 to 1934 Gosset and Fisher would exchange more than 150 letters. In 1924, Gosset wrote in a letter to Fisher, "I am sending you a copy of Student's Tables as you are the only man that's ever likely to use them!" Fisher believed that Gosset had effected a "logical revolution". In a special issue of Metron in 1925 Student published the corrected tables, now called Student's t . In the same volume Fisher contributed applications of Student's t-distribution to regression analysis.

Although introduced by others, Studentized residuals are named in Student's honour because, like the problem that led to Student's t-distribution, the idea of adjusting for estimated standard deviations is central to that concept.

Gosset's interest in the cultivation of barley led him to speculate that the design of experiments should aim not only at improving the average yield but also at breeding varieties whose yield was insensitive to variation in soil and climate (that is, "robust"). Gosset called his innovation "balanced layout", because treatments and controls are allocated in a balanced fashion to stratified growing conditions, such as differential soil fertility. Gosset's balanced principle was challenged by Ronald Fisher, who preferred randomized designs. The Bayesian Harold Jeffreys, and Gosset's close associates Jerzy Neyman and Egon S. Pearson sided with Gosset's balanced designs of experiments; however, as Ziliak (2014) has shown, Gosset and Fisher would strongly disagree for the rest of their lives about the meaning and interpretation of balanced versus randomized experiments, as they had earlier clashed on the role of bright-line rules of statistical significance.

In 1935, at the age of 59, Gosset left Dublin to take up the position of Head Brewer at a new (and second) Guinness brewery at Park Royal in northwestern London. In September 1937 Gosset was promoted to Head Brewer of all Guinness. He died one month later, aged 61, in Beaconsfield, England, of a heart attack.

Gosset was a friend of both Pearson and Fisher, a noteworthy achievement, for each had a massive ego and a loathing for the other. He was a modest man who once cut short an admirer with this comment: "Fisher would have discovered it all anyway."

See also 
 Isaac Henry Gosset

Bibliography 

Gosset:
 "The application of the 'law of error' to the work of the Brewery" (1904, Guinness internal report)
 
 
 
 
 
 
 
 "Evolution By Selection: The Implications of Winter's Selection Experiment", 1933, Eugenics Review, 24, pg293
 Students Collected Papers (edited by E.S. Pearson and John Wishart, with a foreword by Launce McMullen), London: Biometrika Office. (1942)

References

Further reading 
Biographies
 E. S. Pearson (1990) 'Student', A Statistical Biography of William Sealy Gosset, Edited and Augmented by R. L. Plackett with the Assistance of G. A. Barnard, Oxford: University Press. .
 
 Beaven 1947, Barley: Fifty Years of Observation and Experiment

External links 
 Biography by Heinz Kohler
 Student's T Distribution
 Earliest known uses of some of the words of mathematics: S under the heading of "Student's t-distribution", describes briefly how Student's z became t.
 

1876 births
1937 deaths
People from Canterbury
People educated at Winchester College
Alumni of New College, Oxford
English statisticians
20th-century English mathematicians
Computational statisticians